The  was the currency of New France, the French colony in modern-day Canada. It was subdivided into 20 , each of 12 . The New France  was a French colonial currency, distinguished by the use of paper money.

History
After an initial period during which barter prevailed, the French  began to circulate. The premium was set at one-eighth in 1664, raised to one-third in 1680. The New France currency was distinguished by the extensive use of paper money. However, early issues did not maintain their value. In 1717, the premium for coins was abolished, the card money was redeemed at half its face value and the New France  was set equal to the French . Further paper money was issued. In the 1750s, the backing of paper money by coins was discontinued, causing the hoarding of coins.

Coins
A variety of coins circulated in New France, including Spanish dollars, Spanish  and Spanish colonial . In 1670, silver 5 and 15  were introduced for use in New France. In 1709, billon 30- coins were issued in the colony, followed by billon 15  in 1711. Copper 9  followed in 1722. In 1738, billon 1- and 2- coins were introduced in France which also circulated in New France.

Banknotes
In 1685, "card money" was introduced. These were simple notes, hand written on the back of playing cards, which were used due to a shortage of coins.   The first issue was redeemed after 3 months. Despite the French authorities' displeasure, further issues were made into the 1690s. Inflation reduced the card money's value, until it was redeemed at half face value in 1717.

Card money was reintroduced in 1729. In 1753, treasury notes were introduced (also known as ). 48- notes were introduced in 1753, followed by 20  in 1754, 3 and 24  in 1756, 12 and 96  in 1757, and 6  in 1758.

References

External links

French Coinage for Canada and Louisiana
Coins of the French Colonies

 

Modern obsolete currencies
New France
Economic history of France
Currencies of North America
Currencies of Canada